Nigeria Prize for Literature is a Nigerian  literary award given annually since 2004 to honor literary erudition by Nigerian authors. The award rotates among four genres; fiction, poetry, drama and children's literature, repeating the cycle every four years.

History
The Prize was established in 2004 and sponsored by Nigeria Liquefied Natural Gas company. However the process and judging are administered by Nigerian Academy of Science with advisory board made up of members from  Nigeria Academy of Letters and Association of Nigerian Authors.

The Prize was initially $20,000. This was increased to $30,000 in 2006, and again to $50,000 in 2008. In 2011 the prize was increased to $100,000.

Years with no winner

Since its inception, the award is normally awarded in October. However, for three non-consecutive years, the panel of the judges were unable to reach a conclusion on a winner, which resulted in the prize not being awarded in 2004, 2009 and 2015.

Past recipients

See also
Nigeria Prize for Science
List of literary awards
List of richest literary prizes
Grand Prix of Literary Associations
9mobile Prize for Literature
Wole Soyinka Prize for Literature in Africa

Notes and reference

Notes

References

External links

English-language literary awards
Nigerian literary awards
Fiction awards
Awards established in 2004
Poetry awards
Children's literary awards
Dramatist and playwright awards
2004 establishments in Nigeria